Gaelle Mys (born 16 November 1991) is a Belgian artistic gymnast. The 2007 and 2008 senior all-around Belgian National Champion and the 2006 junior European bronze medalist on the floor exercise, Mys qualified as an individual to represent Belgium at the 2008 Summer Olympics in Beijing.

At the Olympics, Mys qualified for the all-around final with a total score of 57.150, a personal best. In the all-around competition, she placed 24th with a 53.90 score.

In July 2012, Mys was selected to replace an injured Julie Crocket as Belgium's representative at the 2012 Olympic Games in women's artistic gymnastics. This was her second Olympic Games. At the 2013 World Artistic Gymnastics Championships, Mys finished 18th in the all-around.

She also participated at the 2016 Summer Olympics.

As well as three Olympic Games, Mys took part in five World Championships (2010, 2011, 2013, 2014 and 2015), the 2014 and 2016 European Championships and the 2015 European Games.

References

External links
 
 
 
 

1991 births
Living people
Belgian female artistic gymnasts
Gymnasts at the 2008 Summer Olympics
Gymnasts at the 2012 Summer Olympics
Gymnasts at the 2016 Summer Olympics
Olympic gymnasts of Belgium
European Games competitors for Belgium
Gymnasts at the 2015 European Games
Belgian women gymnasts